Ministry of Municipal and Rural Affairs and Housing (MoMRAH) is a government ministry in Saudi Arabia that is responsible for the supervision and regulation of municipalities in the country. Established in 1975, the current Minister is Majid Al-Hogail who was appointed as the acting minister in February 2020. As to the deputy minister, it has been Dr. Ahmed Jamil Kattan since 2019.

Responsibilities 
The ministry supervises the administration of municipalities across the country, including cities, towns, and villages. It provides maintenance and development services for all municipalities. The ministry is also responsible for providing basic infrastructure and road development in the country.

References 

1975 establishments in Saudi Arabia
Municipal
Government agencies established in 1975
Saudi